Eggshells is an Australian sitcom about a divorced man. It aired on ABC TV from 1991 to 1993 and ran for two seasons and 15 episodes.

Its first season premiered on 11 February 1991, and it returned for a second season on 17 July 1993.

Cast
 Garry McDonald as Frank Rose
 Judy Morris as Kathy
 Susan Lyons as Jill
 Christine Amor as Vanessa
 Rebecca Smart
 Ben Unwin as Andrew
 Justin Rosniak

References

External links
 

Australian Broadcasting Corporation original programming
1991 Australian television series debuts
1993 Australian television series endings
Australian television sitcoms